Darryl Richard II (born June 17, 1986) is a former American football defensive tackle. He was drafted by the New England Patriots in the seventh round of the 2009 NFL Draft. He played college football at Georgia Tech.

Early years
Richard lived in St. Rose, Louisiana and attended Destrehan High School in Destrehan, Louisiana, where he played football as a defensive tackle, graduating in 2004 as his class valedictorian. He was a finalist for the Franklin D. Watkins Memorial Trophy in 2004, presented by the National Alliance of African American Athletes. As a senior, he played in the United States Army All-American game.

College career
Richard attended the Georgia Institute of Technology, where he earned his degree in management in three years, before earning his MBA in December 2008. As a freshman, he recorded four sacks and started the final four games of the season. After redshirting his sophomore season in 2005 due to an injury, Richard recorded 20 tackles in 2006 and was named to the Atlantic Coast Conference All-Academic team. He started all 13 games at defensive tackle in his junior season in 2007, tallying four and a half sacks on the season. In his final season in 2008, Richard was named second-team All-ACC, and was a finalist for the NCCA Draddy Trophy for student-athletes. He was named to the East-West Shrine Game after the season before entering the 2009 NFL Draft. In the Wonderlic Test for intelligence administered as part of the draft scouting process, Richard scored the highest among all defensive linemen who took the test.

Professional career
Richard was drafted by the Patriots in the seventh round (234th overall) of the 2009 NFL Draft. On July 16, he was signed to a four-year contract. He was waived by the Patriots on September 5, and re-signed to the team's practice squad the next day. In mid-season, the Patriots raised Richard's salary in mid-season from the practice squad minimum (about $150,000) to that of a first-year active roster player ($310,000). After spending the entire season on the practice squad, Richard was re-signed to a future contract on January 12, 2010. He was placed on injured reserve on August 31, 2010, with a foot injury. He was waived by New England again on September 2, 2011.

References

External links
New England Patriots bio
Georgia Tech Yellow Jackets bio

1986 births
Living people
People from St. Rose, Louisiana
Players of American football from New Orleans
American football defensive tackles
American football defensive ends
Destrehan High School alumni
Georgia Tech Yellow Jackets football players
New England Patriots players